Holding a Wolf by the Ears is the fourth studio album by the American post-hardcore band From Autumn to Ashes. It is also the only album without the band's original singer, Ben Perri, as well as the band's first album recorded with Rob Lauritson on 2nd guitar, and their last with Josh Newton on bass.

One track from Holding a Wolf by the Ears was released on December 14, track "Deth Kult Social Club." and later "Everything I Need". The album was released on April 10, 2007 by Vagrant Records. It debuted at number 74 on the U.S. Billboard 200, selling about 10,000 copies in its first week. The track "Daylight Slaving" was chosen as a featured song on the soundtrack for Madden NFL 08. The song "Love It or Left It" was featured in the soundtrack for both ATV Offroad Fury 4 and ATV Offroad Fury Pro. The song "On the Offensive" was also featured on the Saw IV soundtrack. Music videos were made for the songs "Pioneers" (released before the album) and "Deth Kult Social Club" (released after the album).

Track listing
All music composed by From Autumn to Ashes. All lyrics by Francis Mark except where noted.

Personnel
From Autumn to Ashes
Josh Newton - bass
Jeff Gretz - drums
Brian Deneeve - guitar
Rob Lauritson - guitar
Francis Mark - vocals, drums

References

2007 albums
From Autumn to Ashes albums
Vagrant Records albums
Albums produced by Brian McTernan